Claude Burton (5 July 1903 Littleton, Colorado – 17 April 1974 Compton, California) was an American racecar driver.

Indy 500 results

1903 births
1974 deaths
Indianapolis 500 drivers
Racing drivers from Colorado
Racing drivers from Denver
Sportspeople from Littleton, Colorado